Ranleigh Gary Collins (September 27, 1935 – June 17, 2022) was a Canadian ice hockey player who played two playoff games in the National Hockey League for the Toronto Maple Leafs during the 1958–59 season. The rest of his career, which lasted from 1956 to 1968, was spent in the minor leagues..

Collins died in June 2022 at the age of 86.

Career statistics

Regular season and playoffs

References

External links
 

1935 births
2022 deaths
Canadian expatriate ice hockey players in the United States
Canadian ice hockey centres
Ice hockey people from Toronto
Johnstown Jets players
Kitchener Greenshirts players
New Westminster Royals players
Ontario Hockey Association Senior A League (1890–1979) players
Pittsburgh Hornets players
Providence Reds players
Quebec Aces (AHL) players
Rochester Americans players
San Francisco Seals (ice hockey) players
Toronto Maple Leafs players
Toronto Marlboros players